Cotinus coggygria, syn. Rhus cotinus, the European smoketree, Eurasian smoketree, smoke tree, smoke bush, Venetian sumach, or dyer's sumach, is a Eurasian species of flowering plant in the family Anacardiaceae.

Description
The autumn colour can be strikingly varied, from peach and yellow to scarlet. Most of the flowers in each inflorescence abort, elongating into yellowish-pink to pinkish-purple feathery plumes (when viewed en masse these have a wispy 'smoke-like' appearance, hence the common name "smoke tree") which surround the small drupaceous fruit that develop.

Fossil record
Macrofossils of C. coggygria from the early Pliocene epoch have been found in Western Georgia in the Caucasus region.

Distribution and habitat
The species is native to a large area from southern Europe, east across central Asia and the Himalayas to northern China.

Uses

Ornamental plant 

It is commonly grown as an ornamental plant, with several cultivars available. Many of these have been selected for purple foliage and flowers.

The following cultivars have gained the Royal Horticultural Society's Award of Garden Merit:-
'Flame' 
='Ancot'  
'Royal Purple' 
'Young Lady'

Dyestuff 

The wood was formerly used to make the yellow dye called young fustic (fisetin), now replaced by synthetic dyes.

The species, along with other members of the sumac family, has been used to make red dyes for textiles including weft-wrapped soumak rugs and bags in the Middle East. The names sumac and soumak likely derive from the Arabic and Syriac word , meaning "red".

Gallery

References

External links
 
Flora Europaea: European distribution

Anacardiaceae
Flora of Azerbaijan
Plant dyes
Flora of Pakistan
Flora of Ukraine